Frederick Waldegrave Head MC & Bar (18 April 1874 – 18 December 1941) was Anglican archbishop of Melbourne, Australia.

Head was born in Tollington Park, London, the son of the Rev. Canon George Frederick Head and his wife Mary Henrietta, née Bolton. Educated at Alton School, Plymouth, Windlesham House School, near Brighton, Repton School, and Emmanuel College, Cambridge, Head graduated B.A. with first class honours in history in 1896, proceeded to M.A. in 1900, and received a B.D. degree in 1929. He was ordained deacon in 1902 and priest in 1903, was dean and tutor of Emmanuel College from 1903 to 1907, then senior tutor and chaplain of the college from 1907 to 1921.
In 1915, he was interviewed for a commission as a Temporary Chaplain to the Forces. His lack of parochial experience counted against him, and he was thought to be ‘slow in movement’. After a second interview in January, 1916, he was appointed and posted to France. He could speak French and had already spent a year there working in a YMCA hut. He was attached to the Guards Division. ‘Head was accepted from the start (by the Guards) ... Head, however, who might have been expected to be handicapped from the start as a Cambridge don, was an outstanding success. He was as successful with the officers in a lecture on Napoleon as he was with the men singing ‘Tommy Tickler’s Jar’’. By the time of his demobilisation in 1919, Head was Senior Chaplain to the Guards Division and the holder of a Military Cross and Bar. There is a citation for the Bar, ‘For most conspicuous gallantry and devotion to duty during operations lasting for several days, when he was continually in the front line accompanying an attack, and by his splendid example inspired the men on all occasions, whilst his attention to wounded and dying men were performed under continuous and heavy fire of all descriptions. His behaviour was the admiration of the whole division' In October, 1918, the Deputy Chaplain-General described him as ‘First Rate ... in every way’. His apparent ‘slowness in movement’ and lack of parochial experience did not, as was feared, handicap his excellent wartime service.
He was vicar of Christ Church, East Greenwich from 1922 to 1926, chaplain to King George V from 1922 to 1929, and canon and sub-dean of Liverpool Cathedral from 1926 to 1929. 
Head was considered for bishoprics in England during the 1920s, particularly Peterborough in 1923, but he had not impressed Randall Davidson, Archbishop of Canterbury who wrote to the Prime Minister that Head ‘was not in what I should regard as the first rank of men of power and leadership' In September 1929 he accepted the archbishopric of Melbourne, was consecrated in Westminster Abbey on 1 November 1929, and enthroned in St Paul's Cathedral, Melbourne, on 23 December 1929.

In Melbourne, Head soon made himself acquainted with the various parishes and clergy. He found a diocese that already had many commitments in connexion with church schools and social work, and the financial depression which began just about the time of his arrival made a strong forward policy inopportune. He interested himself in the question of the re-union of the Christian churches, and in the holding together of his own diocese by preaching peace and goodwill to all, and setting a personal example of plain living and high thinking. At one period he voluntarily gave up a quarter of his stipend, and refused to countenance any expenditure which might lighten his own burden of work. If it was possible to help a parish by attending some function or service he made it his duty to be there, and his relations with his clergy were of the friendliest. From 1933 he was chaplain general to the Commonwealth military forces. Tactful, unassuming, and modest, scholarly and hard-working, much interested in social questions, Head was a steady influence for good in Melbourne. On 7 December 1941 he was driving his car to a confirmation service and ran into a post; he died from his injuries on 18 December 1941. His ashes are interred in St Paul's Cathedral, Melbourne. He married in 1904 Edith Mary Colman, who survived him with one son. Head was the author of The Fallen Stuarts, published in 1901, and Six Great Anglicans, which appeared in 1929.

References

James Grant, 'Head, Frederick Waldegrave (1874 - 1941)', Australian Dictionary of Biography, Volume 9, MUP, 1983, pp 244–245.

1874 births
1941 deaths
20th-century Anglican archbishops
Alumni of Emmanuel College, Cambridge
Anglican archbishops of Melbourne
Australian people of English descent
British Army personnel of World War I
Deans of Melbourne
People educated at Repton School
People educated at Windlesham House School
People from Islington (district)
Royal Army Chaplains' Department officers
Recipients of the Military Cross
World War I chaplains